Kevin Bua (born 11 August 1993) is a Swiss professional footballer who plays as a winger for FC Sion.

Club career

Servette and Zürich
Bua began to play youth football with Servette. He signed his first professional contract 2013. In summer 2015 he moved to Zürich.

Basel
On 8 July 2016, Basel announced that they had signed Bua on a four-year deal dated up unto 30 June 2020. He joined Basel's first team for their 2016–17 season under head coach Urs Fischer. After playing in two test games Bua played his first team debut for the club in the Swiss Cup away game in the Herti Allmend Stadion on 18 September 2016 as Basel won 1–0 against Zug 94. He played his domestic league debut for the club in the home game in the St. Jakob-Park on 1 October as Basel played a 1–1 draw with Thun. Under trainer Urs Fischer Bua won the Swiss Super League championship at the end of the 2016–17 Super League season. For the club this was the eighth title in a row and their 20th championship title in total. They also won the Swiss Cup for the twelfth time, which meant they had won the double for the sixth time in the club's history.

In their following 2017–18 season under new head coach Raphaël Wicky Bua received more playing time. He scored his first goal for his club in the home game on 30 July 2017 as Basel won 3–1 against Luzern. 

Under trainer Marcel Koller Basel won the Swiss Cup in the 2018–19 season. In the first round Basel beat Montlingen 3–0, in the second round Echallens Région 7–2 and in the round of 16 Winterthur 1–0. In the quarter finals Sion were defeated 4–2 after extra time and in the semi finals Zürich were defeated 3–1. All these games were played away from home. The final was held on the 19 May 2019 in the Stade de Suisse Wankdorf Bern against Thun. Albian Ajeti scored the first goal, Fabian Frei the second for Basel, then Dejan Sorgić netted a goal for Thun, but the end result was 2–1 for Basel. Bua played in five cup games and scored two goals in the match against Echallens.

During his stay with the club Bua netted one hat-trick, this was in the 2019–20 Swiss Cup first round match, on 17 August 2019, away from home against amateur club Pully Football FC. Bua stayed with the club for four season and during this time he played a total of 135 games for Basel scoring a total of 28 goals. 70 of these games were in the Swiss Super League, 14 in the Swiss Cup, 18 in the UEFA competitions (Champions League and Europa League) and 33 were friendly games. He scored 14 goal in the domestic league, five in the cup, three in the Europa League and the other six were scored during the test games.

Leganés
On 19 September 2020, Bua moved abroad and signed a one-year contract with CD Leganés of the Spanish Segunda División.

Sion
On 11 July 2021, he signed a three-year contract with Sion.

International career
Bua was born in Switzerland, he is Spanish descent through his father and mother. He is a former youth international for Switzerland.

Honours
Basel
 Swiss Super League: 2016–17
 Swiss Cup: 2016–17, 2018–19

References

External links
 
 

1993 births
Footballers from Geneva
Swiss people of Spanish descent
Living people
Swiss men's footballers
Association football midfielders
Switzerland youth international footballers
Servette FC players
FC Zürich players
FC Basel players
CD Leganés players
Swiss Challenge League players
Swiss Super League players
FC Sion players
Segunda División players
Swiss expatriate footballers
Swiss expatriate sportspeople in Spain
Expatriate footballers in Spain